KHL Sisak is a Croatian ice hockey team that plays in the Croatian Ice Hockey League. They play their home games at Ledena dvorana Zibel, which was renovated in 2018.

History
The first hockey game was played in Sisak in 1930. It was played between the students of the 7'th High School. Over the years they played partial and irregular matches, mostly between students. Then, at the end 1934 the sports society "Slavia" organized a hockey club. The new Sisak club had its first success at the championship of Yugoslavia in 1937. The players were: Vjenceslav Holubek, Vladimir Berghauer, Želimir Golder, Josip Kovačić, Mate Starčević, Oliver Pötzl, Franjo Knebl, Branko Herlinger and Joža Stampf. At that time, Pötzl and Berghauer were members of the national team. 
In season 1938/39 the club participated in the Yugoslav league, Croatian division with teams from Zagreb, Karlovac and Varaždin. In 1958 and 1959 Sisak hockey players won the Croatian championship and became members of the Federal League.
In 1961 they went on to become Croatian ice hockey champions, formed the club "Segesta," and played their first game against Zagreb's newly formed team Medveščak.
Late in 1971 the Sisak rink "Recreational Center Zibel" was finished and the first international hockey match in Sisak was played between Medveščak and Tesla Pardubice from Czech Republic.

Hockey has continued to evolve in Yugoslavia; Sisak was sponsored by the INA oil company and bore their name. "INA" Sisak repeatedly won first place in the second division of the state championships, and appeared in the first division. Through several years of play, with greater or lesser success, Sisak's young hockey players from the club "INA" became the junior Croatian champions in 1979. In the 1980/81 Croatian league season, the youngest "INA" team won the championship. The club prospered until the war in the '90s, and has come back afterwards, slowly picking up pace as circumstances allowed. New generations took over, keeping the oldest Croatian club alive, now known as ice hockey club "Sisak."

Club identity
KHL Sisak traditional colours are blue and green. These two colours are consistent with the colours of the flag of Sisak. The club plays home matches in mostly blue uniforms, while the away kits are predominantly white. The badge represents a knight, holding an ice hockey stick. The knight is also one of the city's symbol, which represents a rich history of Sisak. KHL Sisak nicknames are Vitezovi (The Knights).

Honours
Croatian Ice Hockey League
  Winners (1): 2021–22
  Runners-up (0): 
  3rd place (0):

Sponsors
KHL Sisak sponsors include companies such as: Hrvatski Telekom and OTP banka.

KHL Sisak in European Hockey 
After winning Croatian Ice Hockey League in season 2021/2022, KHL Sisak qualify for the IIHF Continental Cup. That was the first time that club will competing in European competition. The draw placed KHL Sisak in group A together with Tartu Kalev-Välk, HC NSA Sofia and Skautafélag Akureyrar.  In the final Group A match of the Continental Cup in Sofia, Sisak secured their historic first qualification for the second round with a win against hosts NSA Sofia.

Players

Current roster
Source: https://www.khl-sisak.hrSource: eliteprospects.comAs of 23 September 2022.

  

|}

Retired numbers
KHL Sisak have retired two numbers in their history:

References

Sisak
Croatian Ice Hockey League teams
Yugoslav Ice Hockey League teams
KHL Sisak
Ice hockey clubs established in 1930
1930 establishments in Croatia